Oily Hare is a 1952 Warner Bros. Merrie Melodies animated short directed by Robert McKimson and written by Tedd Pierce. The short was released on July 26, 1952, and stars Bugs Bunny.

The plot also has similarities to the plot of the short The Fair-Haired Hare, which was released one year earlier and it features Devil Rich Texan as Bugs' antagonist. Oily Hare also recycles the same ending where Bugs' home is filled with explosives and blown up.

Plot

In his hole, Bugs sings a wealth-themed variation of "Home on the Range" with a banjo.

An oil tycoon, who sounds, acts and looks like Yosemite Sam, is upset by Bugs' hole because, as a hole on his oil field, it is not producing any oil. He pulls up to the hole in a green stretch limousine that is so long it requires a long-distance telephone operator in the middle of the car to connect the tycoon to his chauffeur, Maverick, so he can tell Maverick (who does not have a speaking role, but communicates by nodding his head) to stop the car. The tycoon says: "Stop the car, Maverick! There's a hole on my property that ain't a-gushin' oil!" On the back door of the limousine, a crest is shown which carries the legend, "Devil Rich—Texan".

Maverick stops the car, pulls a motor scooter out from behind the driver's seat (a Western saddle) and rides the scooter back to Devil Rich Texan back door. After Maverick opens the door, Devil Rich Texan gets out and they both walk over to Bugs' hole.

After Devil Rich Texan surveys the situation, he and Maverick build a derrick over the top of the hole. As they finish, Bugs comes up and asks "What's up doc?". Then Devil Rich Texan explains and tells Bugs to "git". Bugs tells him the hole is, in fact, his home and tells the tycoon to drill someplace else.

Devil Rich Texan tries to evict Bugs, which gets Bugs' dander up. He sends down a box of dynamite, but hears party horns whenever he tries detonating it, and when he has it brought back up, he finds a birthday cake with the lit dynamite sticks for candles. "Now who could'a knowed it was my birthday, especially when it 'tain't?" asks the tycoon. Bugs tells him to make a wish, and he says: "Ah wish...Ah wish...nah: I've got too much of that filthy green stuff already! I know!" He tries to blow out the candles but the dynamite blows up in his face and blowing his nose off in the process, forcing him to cover the injury with his hands.

Devil Rich Texan tries to trick Bugs by saying, "I've got a proposition to talk to you about." When Bugs shows himself, Devil Rich Texan tries to shoot ("What I've got to say, I'm a-sayin' with lead!"), but Bugs fits a pipe with elbows through his ladder and the soil wall of his hole, with a funnel on one end, so the bullets go into the funnel and are directed into Devil Rich Texan's butt. Devil Rich Texan, enraged, orders Maverick to get Bugs out. Bugs steals Maverick's clothes and comes out of the hole dressed as Maverick. Devil Rich Texan decides to get Bugs himself, but cannot find him. Bugs lifts the hat to the audience to confirm that it is him. Devil Rich Texan calls for Maverick, who's still in Bugs' hole, then, ignorant of the situation, calls up the hole for Maverick to lower some dynamite. Bugs sends down as much as possible, at Devil Rich Texan's demands, who says: "I'll blow the critter to the outskirts of Dallas!" Bugs, Devil Rich Texan and Maverick fill the hole with so many sticks of dynamite that Devil Rich Texan, who is in the hole, cannot see his hand before his face. Bugs calls down and tells him to look in his left hand dresser drawer for his "cigareet" lighter, which he uses while still in the hole.

After the explosion, instead of oil, a gusher of carrots comes out of the hole blowing Devil Rich Texan and Maverick to the top of the hole's derrick and Bugs exclaims: "Hey! Looks like I brought in a carrot gusher!". After chomping on one of them, he senses some of the audience's slight disbelief at what they are seeing, adding "Yeah, I know, I know...but anything can happen in 'Tex-ay-us'!"

Home media
This short is available on the fifth volume of the Looney Tunes Golden Collection

References

External links

 Oily Hare at Internet Movie Database

1952 films
1952 animated films
1952 short films
Merrie Melodies short films
Warner Bros. Cartoons animated short films
Films directed by Robert McKimson
Films set in Texas
Bugs Bunny films
Works about petroleum
1950s Warner Bros. animated short films
1950s English-language films